GEUP is a commercial interactive geometry software program, similar to Cabri Geometry. Originally using the Spanish language, it was programmed by Ramón
Alvarez Galván. Recent versions include support for three-dimensional geometry.

References

Further reading
.

External links
GEUP.net

Mathematical software
Interactive geometry software
Science software for Windows